Quch Qar (also Romanized as Qūch Qar) is a village in Bam Rural District, Bam and Safiabad District, Esfarayen County, North Khorasan Province, Iran. At the 2006 census, its population was 84, in 24 families.

References 

Populated places in Esfarayen County